Serlo was Dean of Exeter between 1225 and 1231. He is buried at Exeter Cathedral. Previously he had been Rector of Colaton Raleigh.

Notes

13th-century English Roman Catholic priests
1231 deaths
Deans of Exeter
Burials at Exeter Cathedral
Year of birth unknown